Alexander Charles Waghorn (born 9 January 1995) is an English former first-class cricketer.

Waghorn was born at Wandsworth in January 1995. He was educated at the Royal Grammar School, Guildford before going up to Pembroke College, Cambridge. While studying at Cambridge, he made two appearances in first-class cricket in 2016, playing one match apiece for Cambridge MCCU against Essex at Fenner's and for Cambridge University against Oxford University in The University Match at Oxford. Playing as a right-arm medium-fast, he took 5 wickets in his two matches with best figures of 3 for 79.

Notes and references

External links

1995 births
Living people
People from Wandsworth
People educated at Royal Grammar School, Guildford
Alumni of Pembroke College, Cambridge
English cricketers
Cambridge MCCU cricketers
Cambridge University cricketers